Luca is used in Hungary and Croatia as a feminine given name, equivalent to Lucy in English, but pronounced differently. In Eastern Europe and particularly the Balkans the cognate masculine name is Luka.

Notable people with the name include:

 Luca Ekler (born 1998), Hungarian athlete
 Luca Homonnai (born 1998), Hungarian Olympic athlete
 Luca Ivanković (born 1987), Croatian basketball player
 Luca Kozák (born 1996), Hungarian athlete
 Luca Sardelis (born 2001), Australian actress of Greek descent

See also
 Luca (masculine given name)
 Lucija
 Luce (name)

Croatian feminine given names
Hungarian feminine given names